Lee Je-hoon (born July 4, 1984) is a South Korean actor. He started his career in indie films, then went on to appear in commercial films like The Front Line (2011), Architecture 101 (2012) and My Paparotti (2013), and television series like Fashion King (2012), Secret Door (2014), Signal (2016), Tomorrow, With You (2017), Where Stars Land  (2018), Taxi Driver (2021), and Move to Heaven (2021).

Career

Beginnings
When Lee Je-hoon realized that he wanted to go into acting, he dropped out of the Biotechnology major at Korea University and transferred to the School of Drama at Korea National University of Arts. From 2006 to 2010, Lee appeared in more than 18 student shorts and indie films, notably the queer coming-of-age romance Just Friends?. He also appeared as an extra in a number of commercial films, including erotic thriller The Servant and romantic comedy Finding Mr. Destiny.

2011–2012: Breakthrough
Then Lee had his breakthrough in 2011. He received rave reviews for his performances as a manipulative alpha-male in the haunting indie Bleak Night, and as a morphine-addicted squad leader in big-budget war film The Front Line. He gained mainstream popularity as a shy college student pining for his first love in box-office hit Architecture 101, and though the television series Fashion King was poorly received, his role as a struggling young chaebol heir in Korea's fashion industry further showcased his versatility.

Lee next starred opposite acclaimed veteran actor, Han Suk-kyu in the comedy-drama My Paparotti, which focuses on the special relationship between a high school gang member who dreams of becoming a singer like the late tenor Luciano Pavarotti, and the music teacher who helps him pursue his dream. He next starred in Ghost Sweepers, dubbed the character Jack Frost for the Korean release of 3D animated film Rise of the Guardians, and featured in the crime thriller An Ethics Lesson.

2012–present: Enlistment and return to acting 

For his comeback project after enlistment, Lee chose Secret Door, a period drama about Crown Prince Sado who was controversially executed through death by starvation by his father King Yeongjo; the series reunited him with Han Suk-kyu. This was followed by the Jo Sung-hee-directed film Phantom Detective, a modern retelling of the eponymous folk hero Hong Gil-dong as a private detective in the 1990s.

In 2016, Lee starred in tvN's fantasy crime drama Signal together with Cho Jin-woong and Kim Hye-soo, which was critically and commercially successful. 
 
In 2017, Lee starred in the fantasy romance drama Tomorrow, With You opposite Shin Min-a, portraying a CEO of a real estate company who has the ability to travel through time.
He then starred in the biographical period drama film Anarchist from Colony directed by Lee Joon-ik, playing the character of Park Yeol, a self-proclaimed anarchist and revolutionary activist during the Colonial Era of Japan. The same year Lee starred in the film I Can Speak as a civil servant who also tutors English.

In 2018, Lee starred in the airport-themed melodrama Where Stars Land alongside Chae Soo-bin. Lee and co-star Chae Soo-bin were appointed as honorary ambassadors of Incheon International Airport.

In 2019, Lee filmed the travel reality programme Traveller along with Ryu Jun-yeol where the two stars enjoy a backpacking holiday in Cuba. The same year, he was cast in the film Tomb Robbery.

In 2020, Lee starred in the dystopian action thriller film Time to Hunt which earned him a nomination for Best Actor at the 56th Baeksang Arts Awards. He also starred in the caper story film Collectors.

In 2021, Lee joined the SBS drama Taxi Driver, his small screen comeback after last making a special appearance in Hot Stove League in 2020. Later in May, Lee appeared in the Netflix series Move to Heaven. Lee founded "Company on" in June 2021, after the contract with his former agency expired.

In 2022, Lee organized a fan meeting which was held at Central World Live in Bangkok, Thailand on June 22 and 23. Later in August, it was announced that Lee will hold another fan meeting at the Centennial Memorial Hall of Yonsei University concert hall in Seodaemun-gu, Seoul. Later in October, Lee made a comeback to the small screen with a special appearance in the SBS drama One Dollar Lawyer.

Personal life 
Lee enlisted on October 25, 2012, for his mandatory military service as a member of the Seoul Metropolitan Police Agency riot police. He was discharged on July 24, 2014.

Philanthropy 
On March 6, 2022, Lee donated 100 million won to the Hope Bridge Disaster Relief Association to help the victims of the massive wildfire that started in Uljin, Gyeongbuk and has spread to Samcheok, Gangwon.

Filmography

Film

Television series

Web series

Television show

Hosting

Music video

Discography

Goodwill ambassador
 2016 Honorary Ambassador of Korean Academy of Film Arts (KAFA) by Korean Film Council
 2016 Honorary Ambassador of Korea National Police Agency's Human Rights
 2016 Honorary Ambassador of Oxfam Korea
 2017 Honorary Ambassador of Seoul Biennale of Architecture and Urbanism.

Awards and nominations

State honors

Notes

References

External links

 
 
 

South Korean male film actors
South Korean male television actors
Korea National University of Arts alumni
1984 births
Male actors from Seoul
Living people
South Korean male web series actors